D4 motorway, formerly Expressway R4 is a highway in the Czech Republic, southwest from Prague.

Sections of the motorway:

Unfinished sections

Images

External links

 motorway.cz (English)
 R4 expressway (Czech only)

R04
Proposed roads in the Czech Republic